Reyhanluy-e Sofla (also Romanized as Reyḩānlūy-e Soflá; also known as Reyḩānlū-ye Soflá) is a village in Chaldoran-e Shomali Rural District, in the Central District of Chaldoran County, West Azerbaijan Province, Iran. At the 2006 census, its population was 15, in four families.

References 

Populated places in Chaldoran County